First Lady of Armenia refers to the wife of the president of Armenia. The country's current first lady is Anahit Minasyan, who has held the position since March 13, 2022. To date, there have been no first gentlemen of Armenia.

First ladies of Armenia (since 1991)

Living first ladies 
, there are four living former first ladies, as identified below.

References 

Armenia